The first version of this article has been based in the text of :el:Ρίεια of the Greek Wikipedia published under GFDL.

Rhieia (Greek: Ρίεια, modern transliterations: Rieia or Riia) was a sporting event that took place during the ancient times.  The game was held in the town of Antirrio.  Little information about the games is now available and manuscripts are now lost.

References

History of the City (Ιστορίες της πόλης = Istories tis Polis), Peri Edition, 2004 

Ancient Greek athletic festivals
Festivals in ancient Achaea